Howard David New a.k.a George Flynn (1966 – 3 September 2009) was an English singer-songwriter mainly of the blues and soul genres.  He was one of the first songwriters to sign for the independent publisher Kobalt Music.

Career
New's music career started in Warrington in the early 1980s with a group called "Macabre Day".

He later won the UK's battle of the bands competition in 1987.  He then came second to a Japanese band in the worldwide event shortly afterwards.

As time went on New had worked with many different well-known artists such as Beverley Knight, Louise Redknapp, Lucie Silvas, Rachel Stevens (formally of S Club fame), Robert Plant of Led Zeppelin, Mikey Graham from Boyzone and Gary Barlow from Take That.

Jools Holland once commented that with his own piano skills and New's voice, they could be Ray Charles

He was killed in a car crash aged 42 near his home in Manchester.  His wife was called Jane and he had a daughter named Scarlett.  His parents Brian and Ellen New survived him as did his two sisters Angela and Carol as well as brother Brian Jnr.  His funeral took place at St Joseph's Church in Penketh on Monday 14 September 2009.

References

External links

Howard New's Myspace page

1966 births
2009 deaths
English soul singers
English male singer-songwriters
Road incident deaths in England
20th-century English singers
20th-century British male singers
20th-century English male writers